Tim Zeegers (born 12 March 2000) is a Dutch professional footballer who plays as a midfielder for Eerste Divisie club MVV.

Career
Zeegers started playing football with Geulsche Boys alongside his nephew and future MVV teammate, Lars Schenk. Zeegers made his professional debut for MVV as a starter on 30 August 2020, the first matchday of the 2020–21 Eerste Divisie season, in a 0–0 away draw against Almere City.

On 24 May 2022, Zeegers signed a contract extension with MVV, keeping him in Maastricht until 2023, with an option for an additional year.

Career statistics

References

External links
 

2000 births
Living people
Dutch footballers
Association football midfielders
MVV Maastricht players
Eerste Divisie players
Footballers from Limburg (Netherlands)
People from Meerssen